The Guilt of Doctor Homma is a 1951 West German crime film directed by Paul Verhoeven and starring Werner Hinz, Ilse Steppat and Viktoria von Ballasko. It was shot at Göttingen Studios and on location around Hanover. The film's sets were designed by the art director Erich Grave.

Cast

References

Bibliography

External links 
 

1951 films
1951 crime drama films
1950s legal films
German crime drama films
West German films
1950s German-language films
Films directed by Paul Verhoeven (Germany)
Films set in prison
Legal drama films
Constantin Film films
German black-and-white films
1950s German films
Films shot at Göttingen Studios